ICSP may refer to:

In-circuit serial programming (ICSP), a method for programming microcontrollers
Indian Centre for Space Physics, a research institute in India
Institute of Corporate Secretaries of Pakistan, a professional body in Pakistan
International Committee on Systematics of Prokaryotes
 International Council on Shared Parenting